Festus Arthur (born 27 February 2001) is a German professional footballer who plays for FC Halifax Town as a defender.

Early and personal life
Arthur was born in Hamburg, Germany, and is of Ghanaian descent.

Career
Arthur began his career with Stockport County during the 2019–20 season, scoring 2 goals in 31 league games. In the January 2020 transfer window Arthur attracted interest from a number of bigger clubs, including Hull City.

He signed a three-year deal with Hull City in July 2020 after moving for an undisclosed fee. He made his debut for the club on 8 September 2020 in the EFL Trophy match against Leicester City U21.

In August 2021 he moved on a season-long loan to Barrow. On 18 January 2022, Arthur was recalled from his loan spell.

On 26 July 2022 Arthur's contract with Hull City was terminated by mutual consent so he could join FC Halifax Town.

Style of play
Upon signing for Hull City in July 2020, the club described him as "a powerful centre-half who can also operate in midfield", while club manager Grant McCann described him as "phenomenal".

References

2001 births
Living people
German sportspeople of Ghanaian descent
German footballers
Stockport County F.C. players
Hull City A.F.C. players
Barrow A.F.C. players
FC Halifax Town players
Association football defenders
German expatriate footballers
German expatriate sportspeople in England
Expatriate footballers in England
English Football League players
Footballers from Hamburg